In enzymology, a methanol-5-hydroxybenzimidazolylcobamide Co-methyltransferase is an enzyme that catalyzes the chemical reaction

methanol + 5-hydroxybenzimidazolylcobamide  Co-methyl-Co-5-hydroxybenzimidazolylcob(I)amide + H2O

Thus, the two substrates of this enzyme are methanol and 5-hydroxybenzimidazolylcobamide, whereas its two products are Co-methyl-Co-5-hydroxybenzimidazolylcob(I)amide and H2O.

This enzyme belongs to the family of transferases, specifically those transferring one-carbon group methyltransferases.  The systematic name of this enzyme class is methanol:5-hydroxybenzimidazolylcobamide Co-methyltransferase. Other names in common use include methanol cobalamin methyltransferase, methanol:5-hydroxybenzimidazolylcobamide methyltransferase, and MT 1.

Structural studies

As of late 2007, only one structure has been solved for this class of enzymes, with the PDB accession code .

References

Further reading 

 

EC 2.1.1
Enzymes of known structure